Asuboni Rails is a town located in the Kwahu West Municipal District of the Eastern Region of Ghana.

The town is named after the Asuboni River and the presence of a rail line in the town.

Location 
It is located along the defunct Accra–Kumasi railway line.

References 

Populated places in the Eastern Region (Ghana)